"Beautiful Girls" is the debut single by reggae-influenced musician Sean Kingston from his eponymous debut; it was first released in 2007, when Kingston was 17. The song samples Ben E. King's classic "Stand by Me". The song is about a boy who feels “suicidal” (or "in denial" in the edited version) over being unable to be with a "beautiful girl". It is Kingston's signature song.

Rapper Lil Mama and actors Kenny Vibert and Lil' JJ are featured in the music video directed by Marcus Raboy, which hit 1 billion Youtube views on September 8, 2022.

Lyrics controversy
Due to the lyrics containing references to suicide, the track was removed from various radio playlists including FM104 in Dublin, where complaints were phoned in on a late night chat show, The Adrian Kennedy Phoneshow, and Wild 102 in Roseau, Minnesota. It was allegedly pulled from 2FM although a spokesperson said the song was not on its playlist at the time but did not confirm if it had been prior. FM104 replaced "suicidal" with "in denial", a change Sean Kingston made for the radio station. The edited version also changed the line "Damn all these beautiful girls" to "Man, all these beautiful girls", and "When I went away for doing my first crime" became "When I'd rush back just to see you in time".

Track listing
US promo CD
"Beautiful Girls" (main version) – 3:45
"Beautiful Girls" (instrumental) – 3:45
"Beautiful Girls" (a cappella) – 3:45

UK CD single

"Beautiful Girls" (album version) – 4:02
"Beautiful Girls" (a cappella) – 3:41
"Beautiful Girls" (instrumental) – 3:40
"Beautiful Girls" (remix)  – 3:27
"Beautiful Girls" (video)

Official remixes
Official remix featuring Fabolous and Lil' Boosie – (3:28)
Official remix featuring AC – (4:12)
Official remix featuring Lil Mama – (3:50)

Official versions
 Main version, radio edit – 3:43
 Album version, LP version – 4:02
 Extended version, video version – 4:17

Chart performance
The song benefited from extensive airplay before its digital release, reaching as high as number 17 on the Hot 100. On July 24, "Beautiful Girls" was accidentally leaked onto the US iTunes Store, two days before the planned release date. The week after the song's digital release it hit number one on Billboards Hot Digital Songs, debuting with 260,000 downloads in its first week (the second highest digital sales for a new song of 2007, only behind Rihanna's "Umbrella"). Kingston became the first artist born within the 1990s to top the Hot 100, beating rapper Soulja Boy Tell 'Em to it by six weeks. It has also gone on to occupy the top spot on the US Hot 100 Airplay and the Canadian Hot 100. It remained on top of the UK Singles Chart for four weeks before being knocked off by the Sugababes' first single from their fifth studio album Change, "About You Now". The song ended 2007 as the year's 15th biggest-selling single in the UK. On the official ARIA charts in Australia, it debuted at number one but fell to number two the following week when Delta Goodrem's comeback single took the top spot. "Beautiful Girls" returned the next week and remained for a month before being replaced by Timbaland's "The Way I Are".

Charts

Weekly charts

Year-end charts

Certifications

Covers
A few months after "Beautiful Girls" was released in 2007, a new online video service called Votigo began a cover contest in which fans could submit covers of the song for a chance to get a call from Sean Kingston. After an online vote user Mallory Robbins won with an a cappella version of the song. Top honors also went to a rock cover of the song performed by the Ailan Christopher Project. Shortly afterwards, singer JoJo released a cover response version of the track which was released on Myspace, however was not featured on her upcoming album. Chris Moyles also released a parody cover, however it was about the song describing how bad it was in his opinion.

The lead singer of Sublime with Rome, Rome, sang the acoustic version of "Beautiful Girls" on RAWsession on October 20, 2008.

The Plain White T's, whose song was knocked out of the charts by this one, did a cover version for Yahoo Music. Lead vocalist Tom Higgenson says that the group "started covering it as a joke almost. We started learning it because we were number one for a few weeks and then we got knocked out of the number one spot by Sean Kingston, by this song. It's kind of like an ode to Sean." To close out the song guitarist Mike Retondo breaks into the chorus of "Stand by Me", which is also done in the cover version by Boyce Avenue, a nod to the fact that that song's bassline is used in "Beautiful Girls". Maverick Sabre did the same at BBC Radio 1's Live Lounge.

Teddy Geiger covered the song on her 2007 tour, due to popularity a recorded version of the song will be featured as a bonus track on the iTunes version of her upcoming CD The March.

Lil' Brianna remixed the song and featured Kingston's vocals on her second mixtape, Princess of Miami.

Jesse McCartney covered "Beautiful Girls" during his Right Where You Want Me tour.

David Archuleta briefly sang the chorus of the song at the end of his May 6, 2008 performance on the American TV show American Idol. He was singing Ben E. King's original "Stand by Me" song.

Deer Tick recorded a cover of "Beautiful Girls", which can be found on Myspace.

Casey Crescenzo of The Dear Hunter recorded a cover of this song and has occasionally performed it live.

Boyband JLS performed a mashup of "Beautiful Girls" and "Stand by Me" as their bottom two performance on the fifth series of the UK TV show The X Factor. A year later on series six of the show, Lloyd Daniels sang the chorus and last verse of the song in his November 30, 2008 performance, also singing King's original "Stand by Me".

Bayside covers the song on Punk Goes Pop Volume Two.

BAMF! recorded a version entitled "Bootyfull Girl".

Russell Crowe, Kevin Durand, Scott Grimes, and Alan Doyle performed a cover version during the press tour for Robin Hood and at several benefit shows afterwards.

Beautiful Girls Reply

"Beautiful Girls" (also known as "Beautiful Girls Reply") is a song by American singer JoJo. It was released digitally on July 20, 2007, as a cover response to "Beautiful Girls" by Sean Kingston. The song samples Ben E. King's classic "Stand by Me" and uses digital pitch correction technology on the vocals. Whereas Kingston's version is about a boy who is suicidal over the failure of his relationship with a "beautiful girl", JoJo speaks from a girl's perspective.

Chart performance
The song debuted at number 39 on the Billboard Rhythmic Top 40 chart one month after its release.

Parodies
Chris Moyles and Comedy Dave from BBC Radio 1 have produced a popular parody, Sean Krapston – A Suicidal song.
Kel Mitchell has produced a song on his Myspace called "Scariest Girl".
Panamanian reggae group Comando Tiburón made a parody of the song in Spanish, called "No Llores Más" ("Don't Cry No More").

Use in media
This song is featured in the 2008 monster film Cloverfield, the 2019 crime drama Hustlers, and on The CW's Gossip Girl. The "suicidal" version of the song, which ends differently from the single mix is also featured in the video game SingStar Hottest Hits. It was the score screen theme for almost games from the peruvian flash games website Inkagames.

See also 
List of Hot 100 number-one singles of 2007 (U.S.)
List of Hot 100 number-one singles of 2007 (Canada)
List of number-one singles of 2007 (Ireland)
List of number-one singles in Australia in 2007
List of number-one singles from the 2000s (New Zealand)
List of number-one singles from the 2000s (UK)
List of European number-one hits of 2007

References

2007 debut singles
Sean Kingston songs
Billboard Hot 100 number-one singles
Canadian Hot 100 number-one singles
Music videos directed by Marcus Raboy
Number-one singles in Australia
European Hot 100 Singles number-one singles
Irish Singles Chart number-one singles
Number-one singles in New Zealand
Number-one singles in Scotland
UK Singles Chart number-one singles
Song recordings produced by J. R. Rotem
Songs written by Jerry Leiber and Mike Stoller
Songs written by J. R. Rotem
Songs written by Sean Kingston
Doo-wop songs
Songs about suicide
2007 songs
Epic Records singles
Music controversies